The Hudson Jet is a compact automobile that was produced by the Hudson Motor Car Company of Detroit, Michigan, during the 1953 and 1954 model years. The Jet was the automaker's response to the popular Nash Rambler and the costs of developing and marketing the Jet ultimately led to Hudson's merger with Nash.

Background

The Hudson Motor Car Company was one of several independent firms competing with the much larger Big Three U.S. automakers (General Motors, Ford, and Chrysler) that produced mainly "standard" large-sized models. Hudson had limited financial resources, and management decided to develop a compact-sized model instead of refurbishing its line of full-size cars and developing a V8 engine. The Hudson Jet had exclusive engineering that included a roomy, comfortable, and solid welded unibody, as well as featuring excellent performance for the era along with good fuel economy and low-cost maintenance.

The Jet was introduced in the middle of the 1953 model year and achieved some success in the crowded compact segment. However, Hudson was unable to foresee the dramatic decline in overall compact car sales during the 1952-1954 period which already included three other makes. As a result, they were only able to produce a little more than 20,000 units for the 1953 model year. It was a car with no real vices, but it effectively destroyed the Hudson Motor Car Company. Consequently, the company was forced to merge with Nash-Kelvinator forming American Motors Corporation (AMC) because of the losses resulting from the Jet project and the falling sales of Hudson's senior line.

Development issues
The initial inspiration for the new small Hudson car was the 1950 Fiat 1400 sedan. Early clay models of Hudson's new compact car carried the name "Bee" in keeping with the automaker's Wasp and Hornet models. 

From the beginning, the Jet project was hampered by Hudson President A.E. Barit, 63 years old in 1953, who disregarded the suggestions of the company's stylists and other advisors. For example, Barit insisted that the compact-sized Jet offer full-size car amenities. While designers attempted to form a car that was lower, wider, and proportionally sleeker to the dimensions of a smaller compact car, Barit would not back away from features such as chair-high seating for passengers, and a "tall" greenhouse with a ceiling that would allow riders to wear their hats while in the car. Barit also decided that the Jet's rear design would incorporate Oldsmobile-like high rear fender and a small round taillight design. The design was further changed to accommodate the personal likes of Chicago, Illinois Hudson dealer Jim Moran, whose dealership became the number one sales outlet for Hudson, accounting for about 5% of Hudson's total production. Moran fancied the 1952 Ford's wrap-around rear window and roofline, and Barit ordered a similar design for the Jet. The final result was that the Jet's styling closely mimicked the larger 1952-1954 Ford in many respects. The strong unitized Monobuilt bodies for the Jet were produced by the Murray Corporation of America of Detroit. One of the reasons for outsourcing the production of bodies "was that Murray agreed to amortize the tooling costs over the production run, reducing the upfront investment" making the Jet possible because Hudson did not have enough resources to pay for the tooling costs.

Early Studebaker body development mule vehicles suffered damage because the engine produced so much torque. A "Twin-H power" version with two 1-bbl downdraft carburetors, aluminum cylinder head, and 8.0:1 compression ratio producing  was optional. This was more power than available from the standard Ford, Chevrolet, or Plymouth engines at that time.

The  engine was a re-engineered version of Hudson's 1932 "3x4.5"  I8, less two cylinders, de-stroked and configured for full-pressure lubrication. It was a flathead design at a time when the rest of the industry was moving to overhead valves.

1953
The Hudson Jet was unveiled in December 1952 at the Hotel Astor in New York City. Hudson was the only make fully committed to stock car racing, so both the founder of NASCAR, Bill France, Sr., and Hudson driver, Tim Flock, the Grand National champion, participated.  For the 1953 model year, the Jet was the only new nameplate among the domestic automakers. In its introductory year, the Jet was available in either Standard or Super-Jet trim levels, with two- and four-door sedan body styles. Unlike the fastback "step-down" bodied Hudson full-size cars, the Jet was designed as a three-box notchback. 

When the Jet emerged for its introduction, it competed with the Henry J, Nash Rambler, and Willys Aero. It was shorter than the Henry J and the Willys Aero, as well as the narrowest and tallest of all four giving the Jet "a boxy look". Kiplinger's Personal Finance magazine noted that the Jet has "much to recommend it" including "riding qualities [which] match more expensive models", good visibility, quiet operation, and more power than its competition for "excellent pickup and a high top speed". With its optional "Twin-H power", the Jet had more horsepower than any standard engine in the regular-sized Fords, Chevrolets, and Plymouth lines. 

While the 1953 senior Hudsons continued to be based upon the 1948 step-down design, these cars looked sleeker than the smaller, slab-sided Jet models. Unlike the Nash Rambler, which offered premium body styles such as a station wagon, hardtop, and convertible, the Jet was available only in sedan form. Although the Hudson Jet had an advantage by being well-appointed, it was priced higher than base-level full-sized Chevrolet, Ford, and Plymouth sedans.

Standard equipment was at a high level for an automobile of this era. These features included a heater, theft-proof locks, rotary door latches, defroster vents, dual horns, full-wheel covers, an ashtray, and a lighted ignition switch that were typical extras on the competing makes. While the inclusion of a passenger compartment heater as standard may be unusual to present-day car users, even the high-priced Cadillac still counted a passenger compartment heater as extra in 1953, at an option cost of US$199.

Total production in the U.S. for the 1953 model year was 21,143.

The tea cup test
Hudson resorted to a variety of marketing ploys to get consumers interested in the Jet, including the "Tea Cup Test". This fuel economy test utilized special kits comprising a glass cylinder, valves and rubber hoses that Hudson dealers attached to test cars. The glass cylinder was mounted to the inside of the front passenger door, with the hoses feeding into the engine's fuel line. An amount of gasoline equal to the amount held in a teacup was added to the glass cylinder, and the car was driven away by a potential customer while a salesperson monitored the cylinder in an effort to prove how far a Jet could travel on that small amount of gasoline.

This novel marketing campaign nevertheless failed to convey the Jet's value as an economical car.

1954

For 1954, the Jet received minor trim updates to its two- and four-door sedans. A new luxury model, the Jet-Liner was added making the Jet a three-series model line. The Jet-Liner came with chrome trim around the windows and body side, gravel shields, as well as upgraded color-keyed vinyl interiors featuring foam rubber seat cushions. 

Because convertibles were available in Hudson's full-sized cars, as an experiment a Jet-Liner convertible was built. This sole example was purchased by Hudson's sales manager, Virgil Boyd.

The 1954 model year production in the U.S. of the Jet series was 14,224 units.

American Motors
The estimated $10 to 16 million cost of developing and tooling up for the production of the Jet put Hudson into a precarious position. Without any funds to update the senior Hudson line, Barit convinced the Board that a merger into Nash-Kelvinator represented the best chance of protection for Hudson's stockholders. Barit hoped that the Jet would survive the merger as the resulting new American Motors Corporation focused on the niche market of selling smaller cars. 

When the merger was completed and Barit assumed his seat on AMC's Board of Directors in 1954, the first Hudson model to terminate production was the Jet. The new company could then focus on the more successful Nash Rambler. Henceforth, Hudson dealers would have badge-engineered versions of Nash's Rambler and Metropolitan compacts to sell as Hudson products.

Motorsports
The Hudson Jet was fielded in the grueling Carrera Panamericana, described as the world's greatest road race. The 1953 race included Malcolm Eckart finishing in 53rd place, Segurs Chapultepec in 41st, and Enrique Paredes in 42nd, out of the 182 cars that started. Francisco Ramirez finished eighth in the Turismo Especial.

In drag racing, an Ike Smith–prepared Hudson Jet with a  "Twin H"  I6 Hornet engine ran consistent low-14-second times. The firewall required modification as the larger engine was not available from the factory, but the National Hot Rod Association (NHRA) made an exception to its rules for this car.

Legacy
Automobile historian Richard M. Langworth has called the Jet "the car that torpedoed Hudson". While there was the negative effect of the Jet on the company's financial condition, it was also a time when market forces, including steel prices and labor costs, as well as the sales war between Ford and Chevrolet, contributed to the demise of the smaller "independent" automakers such as Packard, Studebaker, and Willys.

The Jet served as the platform for a sleek two-passenger sporty coupé called the Italia. The Hudson Italia was designed by Frank Spring with the objective of using the body for the Hudson Jet, but Barit wanted a conventional automobile. The limited production Italia featured a body built by Carrozzeria Touring of Milano, with the Jet's standard drivetrain including the I6 engine producing . The Italia is arguably "one of the most uniquely designed American sports cars produced during the '50s." One prototype 4-door sedan was also built.

Collectibility 
Hudson Jet owners today are part of a small group who enjoy driving a dependable six-passenger vehicle from one of the independent automakers. The most desirable collector cars are the 1954 Hudson Jet-Liner in either the two- or four-door sedan versions as these were the top-line offering in the car's second and final year. The relative values of Hudson automobiles, in general, may make extensive repairs on a worn-out example a relatively poor investment value, but combining the simplicity with the relatively low prices of the Hudson Jet "make it a great father-son restoration project."

Notes

References

External links

 
 History of the Hudson Jet by the Hudson-Essex-Terraplane Club
 The Jet Set is a special interest group for owners and enthusiasts of the Hudson Jet
 Hudson-Essex-Terraplane Club
 
 
 
 </ref>

Jet
Hudson Jet
Rear-wheel-drive vehicles
Sedans
Coupés
Cars introduced in 1953